"Too Much, Too Young, Too Fast" is the second single from Runnin' Wild by the Australian hard rock band Airbourne. It is one of the band's most famous songs.

Track listing 
"Too Much, Too Young, Too Fast"

Personnel 
Joel O'Keeffe – lead vocals, lead guitar
David Roads – rhythm guitar, backing vocals
Justin Street – bass, backing vocals
Ryan O'Keeffe – drums

Interpretation 
The lyrics focus on the singer's dissatisfaction with the state of modern society. The song likens bankers to "street gangs and mad men" and their business manoeuvres to "private wars", and continues by criticising "the eye in the sky" (personal surveillance), specifically facial recognition, and the paranoia that this then causes. In the chorus, the singer affirms that "if it's the end of days, I'm going out in style", reflecting his desire to seize the day.

In popular culture 
The song is featured in Burnout Paradise and is the official theme of NASCAR 09.
It is the intro theme to the movie Lost Boys: The Tribe.
It was featured in the trailer for I Love You Beth Cooper.
It was featured in Guitar Hero: World Tour.

Charts

References

External links 

2007 singles
Airbourne (band) songs
2007 songs
Roadrunner Records singles
EMI Records singles
Song recordings produced by Bob Marlette